The 2022 Australian Superbike Championship season (known for sponsorship reasons as the Alpinestars Australian Superbike Championship) was the 43rd Australian Superbike Championship season. Wayne Maxwell started the season as the reigning champion, after picking up his third title in 2021.

However, it was Mike Jones who would go on take the title, his third overall. This was the first time a Yamaha mounted rider had won the Australian Superbike Championship since Jamie Stauffer in 2007.

The final round of the season was notable for the presence of MotoGP star Jack Miller in his final ride aboard a Ducati, as well as Moto2 rider Marcel Schrötter and Moto3 rider Joel Kelso.

Race calendar and results
Initially, an 8-round calendar was announced for 2022, however, a round at Symmons Plains Raceway in Tasmania was later cancelled. 

Round 6 of the championship coincided with the final round of the 2022 Superbike World Championship.

Circuit locations

Teams and riders

Championship standings

Riders' championship
Scoring system
Points are awarded to the top twenty finishers. A rider has to finish the race to earn points.

In addition, pole position is awarded 1 point.

References

External links
 

Superbike Championship
Australian Superbike Championship